Michal Frankl (born 1974) is a Czech historian and Head of the Department of Jewish Studies and of the History of Antisemitism at the Jewish Museum in Prague.

Works

References

1974 births
21st-century Czech historians
Historians of the Holocaust in Bohemia and Moravia
Writers on antisemitism
Historians of the Czech lands
Living people